The York Rally South Africa, is an international rally racing event organised by the South African Motorsport Club based in the Mpumalanga Province in South Africa. The event is a round of the African Rally Championship and the South African Rally Championship.

The event was first ran in 1992 as a round of the South African championship with local drivers dominating the event's history. The event turned international in 2011 upon South Africa's re-entry to the African Rally Championship. Multiple South African champion Jan Habig is the most successful driver in the rally's history with six wins over an eight-year period from 1999 to 2006, all in Volkswagen Polos. Enzo Kuun and Serge Damseaux each have four wins.

The rally was known as the Sasol Rally for 25 years, via a sponsorship arrangement with Sasol. In 2017 York Timbers took over sponsorship of the rally.

List of winners
Sourced in part from:

References

External links
Official website
African Rally Championship
Motorsport South Africa

African Rally Championship
Rally competitions in South Africa
Sport in Mpumalanga